Hagieni may refer to several villages in Romania:

 Hagieni, a village in Limanu Commune, Constanţa County
 Hagieni, a village in Mihail Kogălniceanu, Ialomița